Dios de Pactos is the twenty-fourth album released by Christian singer Marcos Witt. The album was recorded live from Miami, Florida. The self-titled single from the album was the winner of the "Song of the Year" category at the 2004 Arpa Awards.

Track listing
"Narración: La Búsqueda" – 00:17
"Yo Te Busco" (feat. Jonathan Witt) (David Bell) – 03:32
"Obertura Para Piano Y Orquestra (Narración: Al Piano en su Presencia)" – 03:54
"Aquí Estoy Otra Vez" (Marcos Witt) – 05:22
"Narración: Salmo 100:4" – 01:00
"Oh Gracias Encontre La Vida" (Steven C. Barr, Emmanuel Espinosa, Juan Salinas, Witt) – 05:42
"Narración: Altar De Bronze" – 00:12
"Vivifícame" (Feat. Ray Alonso) (Espinosa, Salinas, Witt) – 04:25
"Narración: El Lavacro" – 00:53
"Lávame" (Barr, Espinosa, Salinas, Witt) – 03:51
"Sólo Por Tú Sangre" (Barr) – 06:41
"Narración: El Lugar Santo" – 00:33
"Mi Pan, Mi Luz" (Barr, Espinosa, Salinas, Witt) – 05:26
"Amarte Más" (Witt) – 04:08
"Narración: El Lugar Santísmo" – 00:35
"Dios De Pactos" (Barr, Espinosa, Salinas, Witt) – 10:52
"Narración: La Celebración" – 01:43
"Celebraré, Me Alegraré" (Espinosa, Salinas, Witt) (feat. Ray Alonso) – 04:17
"Al Rey" (Barr, Espinosa, Salinas, Witt) – 05:42
"La Batucada, Reprise: Al Rey" (Barr, Espinosa, Salinas, Witt) – 04:13
"Yo Te Busco" (Bell) – 03:58 (Bonus Track)

Personnel 

David Angell – violin
Wiso Aponte – guitar
Janet Askey – violin
Edward Benitez – trombone
Oswaldo Burruel – acoustic guitar
CanZion – executive producer
David Davidson – violin
Ray Alonso DelaBanda – rap
Connie Ellison – violin
Isaac Escamilla – piano, arranger
Jane Escueta – violin
Emmanuel Espinosa – bass
Holger Fath – guitar, arranger
Luis Fernandez – violin
Jason Fite – viola,
Efrain Garcia – cover design
Juan Manuel García – photography
Randall Gonzalez – bateria
Carl Gorodetzky – violin
Lari Goss – arranger
Jim Gray – orchestra director
Jim Grosjean – viola
Lari Gross – arranger
Jack Jazioro – double bass
Brent Kent – recording
Jennifer Kummer – corno D
Anthony LaMarchina – cello
Lee Larrison – violin
Bobby López – trumpet
Esteban López – arranger, drum arrangements
Jim Lotz – bassoon
Ken Love – mastering
Bob Mason – cello
Margaret Mason – cello, viola
Blair Masters – arranger
Chris McDonald – arranger, transcription, orchestra director
Cate Mier – violin
Craig Nelson – double bass
Leslie Norton – corno D
Kathryn Plummer – viola
Carole Rabinowitz-Neuen – cello
Ann Richards – flute
Orlando Rodriguez – engineer, mixing, audio supervisor, audio engineer
Ruddy Rodriguez – saxophone
Juan Salinas – producer
Ruth Gabriela Salinas – photography
Jorge Santos – engineer, recording
Pamela Sixfin – violin
Julie Tanner – cello
Bobby G. Taylor – oboe
Nolita Theo – vocals
Dick Tunney – arranger, producer, orchestra director, orchestra production
Catherine Umstead – violin
Esteban Vázquez – arranger
Allan Villatoro – keyboards
Karen Winkelman – Violin
Marcos Witt – piano, director, orchestra, producer, liner notes
Coalo Zamorano – vocals
Lorena Zamorano – vocals

Awards and nominations 
In addition to the song Dios de Pactos winning the "Song of the Year" category at the 2004 Arpa Awards, the album also garnered other nominations such as "Album of the Year", "Producer of the Year" and "Best Male Vocalist Album". At the AMCL Awards, the album garnered special recognition as "Excellent Production of the Year".

References

2003 live albums
Marcos Witt live albums